O-phospho-L-seryl-tRNA:Cys-tRNA synthase (SepCysS, Sep-tRNA:Cys-tRNA synthase) is an enzyme with systematic name O-phospho-L-seryl-tRNACys:hydrogen sulfide 2-aminopropanoate transferase. This enzyme catalyses the following chemical reaction

 O-phospho-L-seryl-tRNACys + sulfide  L-cysteinyl-tRNACys + phosphate

References

External links 
 

EC 2.5.1